Arleen Whelan (September 1, 1916 – April 7, 1993) was an American film actress.

Early years
Whelan was a native of Salt Lake City, Utah. Before she became an actress, she worked in Southern California as a manicurist, contributing her earnings to help with her family's expenses.

Career
Whelan appeared in 25 films between 1937 and 1957, reportedly after 20th Century Fox director H. Bruce Humberstone saw Whelan working as a manicurist in a barbershop. After her screen test, the studio cast Whelan as the female lead in a film version of Robert Louis Stevenson's Kidnapped (1938).

Whelan's Broadway credits include Oh, Brother! (1945) and The Doughgirls (1942).

Personal life
Whelan wed Alex D'Arcy (an actor) in September 1940, and they were divorced in 1943.  On October 1, 1942, she married Hugh Owen (a film distributor). They separated on July 8, 1952, and she filed for divorce in 1953. Her third marriage, to Warren O. Cagney, also ended in divorce.

On April 8, 1993, Whelan died in Orange, California, following a stroke.

Filmography

References

External links

1916 births
1993 deaths
20th-century American actresses
American film actresses
Actresses from Salt Lake City
Burials at Holy Cross Cemetery, Culver City